Melikhovo is a rural locality (a selo) and the administrative center of Melikhovskoye Rural Settlement, Korochansky District, Belgorod Oblast, Russia. The population was 977 as of 2010. There are 11 streets.

Geography 
Melikhovo is located 35 km southwest of Korocha (the district's administrative centre) by road. Shlyakhovo is the nearest rural locality.

References 

Rural localities in Korochansky District